The 2007 Nigerian Senate election in Akwa Ibom State was held on 21 April 2007, to elect members of the Nigerian Senate to represent Akwa Ibom State. Effiong Dickson Bob representing Akwa-Ibom North East, Erne Ufot Ekaette representing Akwa-Ibom South and Aloysious Akan Etok representing Akwa-Ibom North-West all won on the platform of the People's Democratic Party.

Overview

Summary

Results

Akwa-Ibom North East
The election was won by Effiong Dickson Bob of the Peoples Democratic Party (Nigeria).

Akwa-Ibom South 
The election was won by Erne Ufot Ekaette of the Peoples Democratic Party (Nigeria).

Akwa-Ibom North West
The election was won by Aloysious Akan Etok of the Peoples Democratic Party (Nigeria).

References 

April 2007 events in Nigeria
Akwa Ibom State Senate elections
Akwa